Smbat II (Smbat II Master of the Universe) reigned as King of Armenia from 977 to 989. He was of the Bagratuni line of kings, and the son of Ashot III, whom he succeeded.

Life
Smbat was crowned king on the same day of his father's death. He ruled from the city of Ani, which he fortified. In particular, he ordered the construction of a wall around Ani, also building towers and fortifications to protect the city from north to west. He began the construction of the Cathedral of Ani. His reign was generally a time of peace, only disturbed by conflict between Smbat and his uncle Mushegh in Kars. The latter in 982 incited the Sallarid emir of Āzarbāijān, Abu'l-Haija, to capture and Dvin, attack Smbat's domains and demand from him a tribute. This state of affairs was quickly brought to an end when Abu'l-Haija was captured by Abu Dulaf, the Muslim emir of Goght'n. Smbat concluded a peace with Abu Dulaf that left the emir in control of Dvin and Goght'n. Smbat inspired contention with the Armenian Church when he married his own niece (sister's daughter), which the church strongly opposed.

King Smbat died and was buried in Ani in 989, while the architect, Trdat, by order of the king, had started laying the foundations of the  Cathedral of Ani. This building is still standing today, and with its unique style and simple decorations, is regarded as one of the masterpieces of Armenian architecture. As he did not have any male issue Smbat II succeeded by his brother Gagik I.

See also
Smbat Walls

References

Bagratuni dynasty
Kings of Bagratid Armenia
10th-century monarchs in Asia
10th-century Armenian people